Pau Factor is a major greatest hits album by Mexican recording artist Paulina Rubio. It was released on November 25, 2013 by Universal Music Group to impact of her success as a judge on the American reality television music competition The X Factor. It follows the previous EMI Music major compilation albums Top Hits (2000) and I'm So in Love: Grandes Éxitos (2001). It is also Universal Music's only major compilation. The album consists of Rubio's songs and hits, spanning from her 2000 homonym album 2012 album project Bravísima!.

Upon its release, the compilation was well received by most music critics, while it was criticized for not including all of her hit songs. It peaked at number thirteen in the Billboard Latin Pop Albums chart, while charting inside the top forty in the Top Latin Albums.

Track listing

Charts

References

Paulina Rubio albums
2013 greatest hits albums
Spanish-language albums
Universal Music Latino albums